This article contains information about the literary events and publications of 1584.

Events
 Master Thomas Giles takes charge of the Children of Paul's, a company of boy actors. This is the start of a close association with the works of John Lyly.
 London printer John Twyn is hanged, drawn and quartered for producing an edition of Gregory Martin's Catholic A Treatise of Schisme (1578).

New books

Prose
Giordano Bruno – La Cena de le Ceneri (Ash Wednesday Supper)
John Dee – 48 Claves angelicae (48 Angelic Keys, written in Kraków)
James VI of Scotland – Some Reulis and Cautelis to be observit and eschewit in Scottis poesie
David Powel – The Historie of Cambria, now called Wales (first printed history of Wales)
Reginald Scot – The Discoverie of Witchcraft
Richard Stanihurst – De rebus in Hibernia gestis (Of matters in the history of Ireland)
Lucas Janszoon Waghenaer – Spiegel der Zeevaerdt (Mariners' Mirror, English 1588, Latin 1591)

Drama
'A.M.' (probably Anthony Munday) – Fidele and Fortunio
Robert Wilson (attributed) – The Three Ladies of London

Poetry
See 1584 in poetry
Thomas Watson – Hekatompathia or Passionate Centurie of Love (publication)

Births
May – André Duchesne, French geographer and historian (died 1640)
August 29 – Patrick Young, Scottish scholar and royal librarian (died 1652)
September 15 – Georg Rudolf Weckherlin, German poet (died 1653)
December 16 – John Selden, English polymath (died 1654)
unknown dates
 Francis Beaumont, English dramatist and poet (died 1616)
Anna Ovena Hoyer, German/Swedish poet (died 1655)
Hu Zhengyan, Chinese artist, printmaker, calligrapher and publisher (died 1674)

Deaths
February 18 – Antonio Francesco Grazzini, Italian prose writer (born 1503)
March 10 – Thomas Norton, English lawyer, politician and poet (born 1532)
June 13 – János Zsámboky, Hungarian humanist, philologist and historian (born 1531)
July 23 – John Day, English Protestant printer (born c. 1522)
August 12 – Carolus Sigonius, Italian humanist writer (born c. 1524)
November 21 – Turrianus, Spanish Jesuit Hellenist and polemicist (born c. 1509)
unknown dates
Stephen Batman, English translator (date of birth unknown)
Gerhard Dorn, Flemish philosopher, translator and polymath (born c. 1530)
Alonso Gutiérrez, Spanish philosopher (born c. 1507)

References

Years of the 16th century in literature